Five ships of the Royal Navy have borne the name HMS Cambrian, after Cambria, the classical name for Wales:

  was a 40-gun fifth rate launched in 1797 and wrecked in 1828.
  was a 36-gun fifth rate launched in 1841.  She was hulked in 1872, converted into a floating factory in 1880 and was sold in 1892.
  was an  second class cruiser launched in 1893. She was used as a base ship from 1916, being renamed HMS Harlech. She was renamed HMS Vivid in 1921 and was sold in 1923.
  was a  light cruiser launched in 1916 and sold in 1934.
  was a  destroyer. She was laid down as HMS Spitfire, but was renamed before her launch in 1943. She was sold in 1971.

Royal Navy ship names